Gustav Vilbaste  (until 1935 Gustav Vilberg; 3 September 1885 in Haavakannu, Kodasoo Parish – 21 February 1967 in Tallinn) was an Estonian botanist, publicist and conservationist.

He wrote the first Estonian-language keybooks on Estonian flora.

He was an honorary member of the Estonian Naturalists' Society.

References

External links
Page at Loodus.ee 

1885 births
1967 deaths
20th-century Estonian botanists
Ethnobotanists
Conservationists
People from Kuusalu Parish
Recipients of the Protection of Natural Amenities Medal, Rank II
Recipients of the Order of the White Star, 4th Class